The Fond Playing Field is a football venue in Sauteurs, Saint Patrick Parish, Grenada. Redevelopment, which included increasing spectator seating capacity to 1,000; adding flood lighting; and resurfacing the playing field, was begun in 2013 and completed in 2016 with $1.6 million Euros provided through the FIFA Goal Project. The property is owned by the government of Grenada and leased to the Grenada Football Association. The ground is home to all GFA Premier Division clubs from the parish.

References

Football venues in Grenada